Lessa Habayeb is a 2006 album by Moustafa Amar.

Charts

Track listing 
 "Lessa Habayeb (Still in Love)"  – 3:30
 "Di Mesh Awaydak" (It's Not Your Habit)"  -4:13
 "Mabahibkish (I Don't Love You)"  -3:31
 "Zay zaman (Like Old Days)"  -4:16
 "Kadaba (Liar)"  -4:18 
 "Khosara (Waste)"  -3:14
 "Ely Agabny Feek (What I Like about You)"  -2:49
 "Yama Kan Ya Alby"  -3:14 (Once Upon A Time My Heart)
 "Bnzret Een (With a Look in the Eye)"  -2:54
 "Youm Men Ba'd Youm (Day after Day)"  -3:05
 "Harakat" (The Moves)  -3:32

Moustafa Amar albums
2006 albums
Arabic-language albums